Adolph Lipke (25 July 1915 – 15 January 1984) was a South African cricketer. He played in two first-class matches for Border in 1939/40 and 1947/48.

See also
 List of Border representative cricketers

References

External links
 

1915 births
1984 deaths
South African cricketers
Border cricketers
Cricketers from East London, Eastern Cape